Alexander Leslie of Auchintoul (1590–1663) was a Scottish soldier in Swedish and Russian service, Russia's first General and reformer of the Muscovite army in cooperation with Boyar Boris Morozov. He was the son of William Leslie, third laird of Crichie, a branch of the Balquhain Leslies. In 1618 he was an officer in Polish employ, captured by the Russians, but released. He was the owner of  manor and voivode of Smolensk.

Military career

In Sweden and Russia 
In 1629 he was a colonel in Sweden, sent by King Gustav II Adolf on a mission to Moscow and entered the Tsar's service. During the audience by king Michael I of Russia as a member of Swedish mission in Russia he gave a petition for military service in Russia in January 1630. Since March 1630 Colonel Leslie in Russian service. Leslie returned to Sweden in April 1631 to inform Gustav Adolf that war between Russia and Poland was imminent. In 1631 he recruited thousands of soldiers in western countries including Scotland and supervised the first regiments of "foreign order" ("Полки нового строя" or "Полки иноземного строя", Polki novovo (inozemnovo) stroya), that was the Russian term that was used to describe military units organised and armed along western lines. He subsequently advanced to the rank of a Russian General and was commander of Russian forces during the Siege of Smolensk (1654), one of the first great events of the Russo-Polish War (1654–67). Leslie went abroad after the unhappy outcome of the campaign of Smolensk War. Charles I of England wrote to Russian Tsar Mikhail Fyodorovich on behalf of Leslie in March 1637 saying that he was returning to Britain on private business. He writes:

Civil War 
Auchintoul fought for the Montrosians in the Civil War. He was captured at Philiphaugh and, by the direct intervention of Lieutenant General David Leslie, was dealt with leniently compared to other prisoners (most of whom were executed after the battle). With David Leslie vouching for him directly, Auchintoul avoided execution. When David Leslie's petition was read, by Argyll among others, Auchintoul was spared (along with Lord Gray), but was banished from Scotland for life.

Back in Russia from 1647 
So sentenced, Auchintoul returned to Russia at some point after that, with a recommendation from King Charles I and finally settled in Muscovy in 1647. Converted to Orthodoxy in September 1652, his Gods father was Prince Ilya Miloslavsky, after that act he received 23 000 silver rubles. After capitulation of Mikhail Shein in Siege of Smolensk (1609–11) to Poles his regiment was the only that leave the battle with flags and arms.

Family 
 Alexander Leslie of Auchintoul, General and voivode of Smolensk had three sons, Colonel Alexander, Yakov-John and Colonel Fedor-Theodore (?-1695), commander of Belgorodski Regiment.
 John Leslie of Balquhain, son of General Alexander Leslie, was a Scottish cavalry colonel in Russian service killed in the storming of Igolwitz castle on 30 August 1655, he married a daughter of Colonel Crawford in Muscovy, though there are at least three Crawfords with that rank in the Russian service, so it's not entirely clear who is meant.

See also 
Clan Leslie
Leslie baronets
Leslie of Smolensk
Scotland and the Thirty Years' War

Notes

References 

1590 births
1663 deaths
Russian generals
Scottish generals
Scottish people of the Thirty Years' War
Scottish mercenaries
17th-century soldiers
17th-century Scottish people
Military personnel of the Tsardom of Russia
17th-century Russian military personnel

Russian people of the Russo-Polish War (1654–1667)
Russian people of the Smolensk War
Covenanters
Expatriates of the Kingdom of Scotland in the Swedish Empire
Emigrants from the Kingdom of Scotland to the Tsardom of Russia